Cherkyokh is a rural locality (a selo) and the administrative center of Oktyabrsky Rural Okrug of Tattinsky District in the Sakha Republic, Russia, located  from Ytyk-Kyuyol, the administrative center of the district. Its population as of the 2010 Census was 1,257, down from 1,264 recorded during the 2002 Census.

Geography
The village is located in a flat area by river Tatta.

References

Notes

Sources
Official website of the Sakha Republic. Registry of the Administrative-Territorial Divisions of the Sakha Republic. Tattinsky District. 

Rural localities in Tattinsky District